Walk the Talk is a 2001 Australian film directed by Shirley Barrett and starring Sacha Horler and Salvatore Coco. It was funded by David Geffen.

References

External links
 
 
 Walk the Talk at Shirley Barrett website
 Walk the Talk at Oz Movies
 Review at Senses of Cinema

Australian comedy-drama films
2001 films
2000s English-language films
Films directed by Shirley Barrett
2000s Australian films